Hashkafa (lit., "outlook"; plural hashkafot, hashkafos, hashkafas) is the Hebrew term for worldview and guiding philosophy, used almost exclusively within Orthodox Judaism.  A hashkafa is a perspective that Orthodox Jews adopt that defines many aspects of their lives. Hashkafa thus plays a crucial role in how these interact with the world around them, and influences individual beliefs about secularity, gender roles, and modernity. In that it guides many practical decisions - where to send children to school, what synagogue to attend, and what community to live in - hashkafa works in conjunction with halakha or Jewish law.

Hashkafot 

Although there are numerous hashkafas within Orthodox Judaism
— allegorically there are "seventy faces to Torah" (shivim panim la-Torah)  — 
they may be grouped broadly as Haredi, Hasidic and Modern Orthodox / Religious Zionist, with different approaches and emphases concerning specific topics. Other hashkafas include Torah im Derech Eretz, Talmidei haRambam, Carlbachian, and Open Orthodoxy.

Modern Orthodox 
Both Modern Orthodoxy and Religious Zionism are Hashkafot where the Torah community interfaces substantively with the secular, modern world, each from its own perspective, and with much overlap.  Although not identical, these then share many of the same values and practices.
Modern Orthodox is a stream of Orthodox Judaism that attempts to "synthesize" the secular, modern world with traditional Jewish values and the observance of halakha, or Jewish law. Modern Orthodox Jews value secular knowledge and are culturally, educationally and politically, as well as practically, engaged in society. See Torah Umadda.
Religious Zionism combines Zionism and Torah observance, and views secular activities in support of the State of Israel -  including military service - as religiously important. Adherents are thus similarly engaged with secular Israeli society and are active in politics.
Modern Orthodoxy traces its roots, to the late 1800's works of Rabbis Azriel Hildesheimer and Samson Raphael Hirsch, and in the 20th century, to the teachings and philosophy of Rabbi Joseph B. Soloveitchik.  Rabbi Abraham Isaac Kook's thinking - as well as the writings and interpretations of his son Rabbi Zvi Yehuda Kook - are foundational to religious Zionism, and also influential on Modern Orthodoxy.

Haredi Judaism 
Non-Hasidic Haredi Jews, also called Yeshivishe, Misnagdim, or Litvaks, belong to a stream of Orthodox Judaism that essentially rejects modern secular culture. In contrast to Modern Orthodox Jews who embrace the modern world ( within limits), Haredim follow a strict reading by segregating themselves from modern society. The emphasis is on Torah study and exact observance of halakha, and secular interactions are thus limited to the practical, such as (circumscribed modes of) earning a living.

There is some variation: especially in Israel, Haredis are fully separated from secular society; in the Western world, Haredi life often realizes as Torah U’Parnasah, "Torah combined with a livelihood", sometimes extending to professional life with its requisite education, although many do choose full time kollel (Torah study) as in Israel. 

Haredi Judaism emerged in response to the Jewish assimilation and secularization during the Enlightenment era with hopes to decrease the influence of secular society on Judaism; see  and for discussion re practice, .

Hasidic Judaism 
Hasidic Judaism is a stream of Haredi Judaism that focuses on spirituality and Jewish mysticism as a fundamental aspect of faith. 
Like other Haredim, this community emphasizes observance of halakha, and are insulated from the secular with similar variations; 
however, in distinction from non-Hasidic Haredim their practices are influenced by their mysticism. 
Thus, here:
There is variation in terms of engagement with secular society: some branches such as Chabad and Breslov are actively engaged; groups such as Satmar are entirely isolated, often living in their own enclaves or even towns. 
Hasidic practice  differs somewhat from that of the rest of the Haredi world, in that Hasidim additionally emphasize (i) the relationship with their Rebbe (and correspondingly the literature emphasized); (ii) spiritually-directed individual practices such as Hitbodedut (meditation) and Mikveh (ritual immersion);  and (iii) communal activities, such as the  Tish / Farbrengen. 

Hasidism was founded in 18th-century Western Ukraine during the 18th century by Rabbi Israel Ben Eliezer, known as the Baal Shem Tov, and spread rapidly throughout Eastern Europe. It arose as a spiritual revival movement, emphasizing the importance of joy and happiness at worship and religious life, and the need to cleave and be one with God at all times. See  and Hasidic philosophy.

Specific topics

Secular knowledge 

Judaism values secular knowledge and non-Jews who study it. The Talmud, in Brachot 58a, says that one who sees a non-Jewish scholar should make this blessing: "Blessed be He who gave His wisdom to flesh and blood." 

However, the extent to which a Jew should immerse himself in secular knowledge is contentious. Some argue that the pursuit of secular knowledge complements and refines the understanding of Jewish religious knowledge. This is a fundamental principle of Torah Umadda, an idea closely associated with Yeshiva University. Others view secular knowledge as a worthwhile endeavor as long as it serves a practical end, such as learning biology to become a physician.

Yet others vehemently oppose pursuing secular knowledge, as they believe it is not valuable enough. Some even believe that secular knowledge is dangerous because it contains ideas that are antithetical to the Torah and can cause people to stray from their religious life. Evolution is one popular example.

Modernity 
Because Orthodox Judaism is so deeply entrenched in its tradition, the question of how to incorporate and adapt to modernity, in terms modern of culture and thought, lies at the center of disagreements between Orthodox groups. Modern Orthodox Jews view their interactions with the world around them and the development of society as an integral part of their theology. They do not view modernity as a threat; they embrace it. Modern Orthodox Jews are likely to view themselves as citizens of the modern world. Great Jewish thinkers such as Rabbi Samson Raphael Hirsch and Rabbi Joseph Soloveitchik sometimes integrated modern thought into their worldview. Hasidism is generally opposed to the idea of integrating modern ideas and culture into their well-established theological thought. Hasidic Jews do not wear modern clothing, while Modern Orthodox Jews find no objection to it, provided that the clothing is modest.

Gender roles 

The appropriate role of women in Jewish life and society at large varies across the spectrum of hashkafas. Hashkafas that more readily incorporate modern thought into Jewish life, tend to believe in greater gender equality. However, they will not ignore the framework of Halacha and sacrifice adherence to Jewish tradition for this end.

Some hashkafas do not address or value gender equality; consequently, distinct gender roles are magnified. Many women, especially within the Hasidic community, take pride in their unique role as homemakers, and make their family and children their main focus. 

Currently, there is much disagreement about the educational curriculum for women, particularly if the Talmud may be studied by women. With the exception of Modern Orthodoxy, the majority of hashkafas do not allow women to study Talmud. See under .

Redemption 
Since the emergence of the Zionist movement, many questions have arisen about the permissibility of an autonomous Jewish state in the Land of Israel prior to the arrival of the Messiah. This issue is especially complicated because the Jewish homeland is partly governed by secular Jews who are not strictly Orthodox. Modern-day Israel is thus a particularly antagonistic subject because the line between hashkafa and halakha in this area is blurry.

There are some who oppose the State of Israel in its entirety, and reject its legitimacy; see Three Oaths.
Religious Zionists and Modern Orthodox Jews view the State of Israel as the first step in the process of redemption; Torat Eretz Yisrael is a body of writing devoted to this topic. Certain Hasidic groups, Satmar is the best known, believe that an autonomous Jewish state in the Land of Israel is forbidden by Jewish law, and label Zionists as heretics.

Social life 
For many within the Orthodox Jewish world, self-identity stems from subscribing to a specific hashkafa; therefore, hashkafa plays a central role in the social life of observant Jews. Hashkafas create cultures that can be very different. In the United States, Modern Orthodox Jews cluster to form tight-knit communities that have their own synagogues, high schools, and community centers. Hasidic Jews also tend to live amongst themselves because cross-cultural social integration is difficult. Jews of similar hashkafas prefer to live together because they share much in common.

Marriage and dating: shidduchim
Shidduchim, matching two people together for marriage, is heavily influenced by hashkafas. Jewish blogs are rife with posts about the marital compatibility of men and women who have different hashkafas. Dating websites, like JWed and JDate, require members to fill in a box about their hashkafa. People assume that if a husband and wife have similar hashafas, they will most likely have a happy marriage.

Head covering: kippah

The type of head covering that a man wears is often seen to be an expression of the hashkafa he subscribes to; see discussion below. 

Members of most Haredi and Hasidic groups wear black velvet or cloth yarmulkes (skullcaps; in Hebrew kippot, sing. kippah); men in these communities also wear a black, wide-brimmed hat, often a Borsalino. 

Religious Zionists and Modern Orthodox tend to wear knitted, colored kippot. 
These are sometimes affectionately, and sometimes derogatorily, referred to as a "srugie" (i. e., "knitted" or "crocheted").
See .

As mentioned, many believe that kippot are self-conscious manifestations of a person's hashkafic orientation and social affiliation. This superficial, and often misguided, habit to pigeonhole people based on head coverings has been criticized.

Non-Orthodox hashkafas
Taken at its broadest and simplest definition, hashkafa is the overarching Torah principles that guide human action. In that sense of the word, the term hashkafa is significant to almost all Jewish denominations that mutually associate with certain principles listed in the Torah, especially on a humanistic and philosophical level. One such example is the principle of tikkun olam—taken to mean fixing the world and making it a better place—which is a nonsectarian belief. Reform Jews, Conservative Jews, and Orthodox Jews all value and emphasize this principle, but each endeavor to fulfill this concept differently based upon their respective traditions. Nonetheless, the term hashkafa itself generally is used only within the Orthodox community and refers solely to their guiding philosophies.

See also 

 Orthodox Judaism and esp. 
 Relationships between Jewish religious movements

References

Jewish philosophy
Hebrew words and phrases
Rabbinic Judaism